Çağla Büyükakçay was the defending champion, but lost in the first round to Ksenia Pervak.

Seeds

Main draw

Finals

Top half

Bottom half

References 
 Main draw

Al Habtoor Tennis Challenge - Singles
Al Habtoor Tennis Challenge
2016 in Emirati tennis